Bill Whitten is an American musician and writer.  He was the founding member, principal songwriter and singer/guitarist for St. Johnny He was also the singer/songwriter/guitarist for Grand Mal.

In 2018 he released "Burn My Letters", his first solo album, via I Heart Noise.

St. Johnny formed in 1989 in Hartford, Connecticut and made three full-length albums, two for DGC Records, before disbanding in 1995. Rolling Stone described St. Johnny as "a Connecticut band that likes their music loud and hard, are intent on a punk-edged sound that has more in common with the Ramones or Sonic Youth than with the latest Sub Pop release. In addition, St. Johnny possess a flair for songcraft, hooks and…hummable melodies".

Grand Mal was formed in New York City in 1995 and has recorded for No.6 Records, Slash/London Records, Arena Rock Recording Co., New York Night Train and Groover Recordings.  According to the New York Times: "Grand Mal mixes three parts Rolling Stones, one part Velvet Underground … rock with an unabashed swagger."

He has worked regularly with producer Dave Fridmann and has collaborated on recordings with members of Mercury Rev, Joan as Police Woman, The Flaming Lips, Antony and the Johnsons, Favourite Sons, Home, Shady, The Silent League, Hopewell, The Jealous Girlfriends, The Mooney Suzuki, VietNam, Mike Bones and others.

Discography

St. Johnny Discography

Singles
“Go To Sleep” (7″) (Ajax Records) 1992
“A Car or A Boy” (7″) (Geffen) 1993
“Gilligan/Live at the Sports Page Cafe…” (7″) (Twisted Village) 1994
“I Give Up/One Of The Boys” (7″) (Love Kit) 1994
“Scuba Diving/Welcome Back Kotter” (7″) (Geffen)
EPS
Four Songs (EP7) (Asthma) 1992
Go to Sleep (EP7) (Ajax) 1992
Early Live Recordings (Twisted Village) 1994

Full-Length
High As A Kite  (Rough Trade UK, Caroline) 1993
Speed Is Dreaming (DGC) 1994
Let It Come Down (DGC) 1995

Tracks Appear On:
“Ashes and Slashes” My Companion Turn of the Century (LP) 1990
“Wild Goose Chasing” DGC Rarities: Vol.1 (CD) (Geffen Records) 1994
“Scuba Diving” Buy-Product (CD, Comp) (Geffen Records) 1995
“Scuba Diving” CMJ New Music April – Volume 20 (CD, Promo) (College Music   Journal) 1995
Incredible Son of Swag (CD) (Geffen/DGC) 1995

Grand Mal Discography

EP’s
Grand Mal (No. 6) 1996

Full-Length
Pleasure Is No Fun (CD/LP) (No. 6) 1997
Maledictions (CD) (Slash/London) 1999
Bad Timing (CD) (Arena Rock) 2003
Love Is The Best Con in Town (New York Night Train) 2006
Congratulations You’ve Re-joined the Human Race (Groover Recordings) 2007
Clandestine Songs (Groover Recordings) TBR April 7, 2010

Tracks Appear On:
“Stay in Bed” Jawbreaker (film): Music from the Motion Picture (London) 1999
"Hey Man" This is Next Year: A Brooklyn-Based Compilation (Arena Rock) 2001
Jean and Cover: A Compilation (Groover Recordings) 2005
The World Turns all Around Him: A Compilation (Groover Recordings) 2006
50 Minutes: A Compilation (Exercise1 Recordings) 2006

References

External links 
 Myspace: Grand Mal
 Blogspot: Clandestine Band
 [ All Music Guide: Grand Mal]
 [ All Music Guide: St. Johnny]

Living people
American male singers
American rock guitarists
American male guitarists
People from Windsor Locks, Connecticut
Year of birth missing (living people)